Sanlong is a khum (commune) in Treang District, Takéo Province, Cambodia.

Administration 
The commune contains 12 phums (villages) as follows.

References 

Communes of Takéo province
Treang District